Eliana Maria Piva de Albuquerque Tranchesi (November 24, 1955 - February 24, 2012) was a Brazilian entrepreneur and owner of Daslu, a fashion house, located in São Paulo that specializes in international brands. She brought to Brazilian stores the brands of Dolce & Gabbana, Giorgio Armani, Louis Vuitton, Christian Dior, Prada, Chanel, Burberry, Salvatore Ferragamo, Gucci, Fendi, Chloe, Cacharel, Yves Saint Laurent, Goyard, Tom Ford and Tod's.

Biography

Daughter of Lucia Piva, co-founder of Daslu, Eliana was married to doctor Bernardino Tranchesi with whom she had three children: Bernardino, Luciana and Marcella Tranchesi. After her mother's death in 2005, Eliana began running the store, eventually leaving the Vila Nova Conceição location and moving to a larger space on the exterior, renamed Villa Daslu.

Prison

On July 13, 2005, the Brazilian Attorney General, the IRS and the Federal Police conducted "Operation Narcissus". Eliana was arrested along with her brother Antonio Carlos Piva de Albuquerque and several company officials and importers related to Daslu. However, she was released shortly after testifying.

In April 2008, federal prosecutors asked for Tranchesi's conviction along with six co-conspirators involved in the alleged scheme of fraudulent imports. On March 26, 2009, the Justice Department gave her the maximum sentence of 94.5 years in prison. The other six defendants were also convicted and all were charged with conspiracy, forgery and attempted embezzlement and consummated - lawful to import or export goods without the proper tax payments.  Federal police arrested her in compliance with the court decision the same day, but the defense filed a writ of habeas corpus, and Tranchesi was released within about thirty-six hours, pending further appeal.

Illness and death

In 2006, Eliana revealed that she had removed a lung tumor that had metastasized in her spine and was undergoing chemotherapy and radiotherapy sessions.

She died at dawn on February 24, 2012, in Albert Einstein Hospital in São Paulo, of complications from lung cancer.

References

1955 births
2012 deaths
20th-century Brazilian businesswomen
20th-century Brazilian businesspeople
Businesspeople from São Paulo
Deaths from lung cancer in Brazil
21st-century Brazilian businesswomen
21st-century Brazilian businesspeople